Colchester power station supplied electricity to the city of Colchester, Essex, England and the surrounding area from 1900 to 1960. It was owned and operated by Colchester Corporation prior to the nationalisation of the electricity supply industry in 1948.  The power station was redeveloped several times incorporating new plant.

History
In 1893 Colchester Corporation applied for a Provisional Order under the Electric Lighting Acts to generate and supply electricity to the then town. This was granted by the Board of Trade and was confirmed by Parliament through the Electric Lighting Orders Confirmation (No. 2) Act 1893 (56 & 57 Vict. c. xxxv). The power station was built on Hythe Quay and first supplied electricity in 1900.

Equipment specification 
By 1923 the generating plant comprised:

 Coal-fired boilers generating up to 48,000 lb/h (6.05 kg/s) of steam, these supplied steam to:
 Generators
 1 × 150 kW reciprocating engine driving a generator
 1 × 250 kW reciprocating engine driving a generator
 1 × 350 kW reciprocating engine driving a generator
 1 × 375 kW reciprocating engine driving a generator
 1 × 500 kW reciprocating engine driving a generator
 1 × 750 kW reciprocating engine driving a generator

These machines had a total generating capacity of 2,375 kW of direct current (DC) power.

Electricity supply was at 420 & 210 Volts DC.

New plant 1955
The plant in 1955 comprised:

 Boilers:
 4 × Vickers Spearing boilers with chain grate stokers
 1 × Babcock boiler with chain grate stoker

The total evaporative capacity was 82,000 lb/h (10.3 kg/s), steam conditions were 250 psi and 650°F (17.2 bar, 343°C), steam was supplied to:

 Turbo-alternators:
 3 × Allen’s geared 1.25 MW turbo-alternator
 1 × Allen’s geared 3.75 MW turbo-alternator

The total installed generating capacity was 7.5 MW, with an output capacity of 6 MW.  

Condenser cooling water was drawn from the river Colne and was cooled in two cooling ponds of 0.45 million gallons per hour (0.57 m3/s).

Operations

Operating data 1921–23
The operating data for the period 1921–23 is shown in the table:

Under the terms of the Electricity (Supply) Act 1926 (16 & 17 Geo. 5 c. 51) the Central Electricity Board (CEB) was established. The CEB identified high efficiency ‘selected’ power stations that would supply electricity most effectively. The CEB also constructed the national grid (1927–33) to connect power stations within a region.

Operating data 1946
Colchester power station operating data in 1946 is given below:

The British electricity supply industry was nationalised in 1948 under the provisions of the Electricity Act 1947 (10 & 11 Geo. 6 c. 54). The Colchester electricity undertaking was abolished, ownership of Colchester power station was vested in the British Electricity Authority, and subsequently the Central Electricity Authority and the Central Electricity Generating Board (CEGB). At the same time the electricity distribution and sales responsibilities of the Colchester electricity undertaking were transferred to the Eastern Electricity Board (EEB).

Operating data 1954–58
Operating data for the period 1954–8 is shown in the table:

Colchester power station was part of the Colchester electricity supply district. This district served an area of 195 square miles and a population of 103,600 (1959). It included Colchester, West Mersea, Wivenhoe, Lexden, Winstree, Maldon, Tendering and Samford. The number of customers and the electricity sold was as follows:

In 1958 the number of units sold to categories of consumers was as follows:  

There were 735 miles (1183 km) of high voltage mains in the district comprising 281 miles (452 km) of underground mains and 454 miles (731 km) of overhead cables.

Closure
Colchester power station was decommissioned in about 1960.

See also
 Timeline of the UK electricity supply industry
 List of power stations in England

References

Coal-fired power stations in England
Demolished power stations in the United Kingdom
Former power stations in England
Buildings and structures in Colchester (town)